John O'Hare (26 May 1905 – 12 August 1970) was a Scottish footballer who played as a defender.

Club career
O'Hare played as a defender for Chelsea, amassing 102 league appearances.

References

1905 births
1970 deaths
Scottish footballers
Association football defenders
Shawfield F.C. players
Chelsea F.C. players